On 4 August 1999, NATO announced that the Member of Parliament for the constituency of Hamilton South, in Scotland, George Robertson, had been chosen as their new Secretary-General. This meant that Robertson was required to resign from his seat which he had won at the 1997 general election. The seat had fallen vacant in a Parliamentary recess, and the law does not permit a by-election to be called during a recess if the sitting member resigns by taking the Chiltern Hundreds.

Robertson was elevated to the House of Lords as Baron Robertson of Port Ellen on 24 August 1999, instantly vacating his seat. The writ for the by-election was moved immediately. The Labour Party selected Bill Tynan, a locally based trade union official, to defend the seat. The Scottish National Party, which was likely to provide the main challenge, chose Annabelle Ewing. Ewing was the daughter of Winnie Ewing; who had famously defeated Labour to win the Hamilton by-election of 1967. The Scottish Socialist Party fought a strong campaign for the seat, and Stephen Mungall was nominated by a local group protesting against the ownership of the local football team, Hamilton Academical F.C.

Twelve candidates stood, which was at the time, the most at any Scottish by-election. This figure was surpassed, when thirteen candidates stood at the 2009 by-election in Glasgow North East.

Polling day for the by-election was on 23 September. The Labour Party narrowly held on to the seat, after a recount; the Liberal Democrats polled poorly, their sixth place was the worst placing at a by-election by any major party since the Conservative candidate in the 1990 Upper Bann by-election also came sixth; in by-elections in seats in Great Britain; it was the lowest since the Liberal candidate in the 1948 Glasgow Camlachie by-election also came sixth. The Scottish Socialist Party beat the Conservatives.

Results

Mungall used the description "Hamilton Accies Home, Watson Away", referring to demands by some fans that Hamilton Academical should play their home matches locally and that Watson, a prominent shareholder, should go.

See also
 Hamilton South (UK Parliament constituency)
 Elections in Scotland
 Lists of United Kingdom by-elections

References

External links
Scottish Election Results 1997 - present

1999 elections in the United Kingdom
1999 in Scotland
1990s elections in Scotland
September 1999 events in the United Kingdom
By-elections to the Parliament of the United Kingdom in Scottish constituencies
Politics of South Lanarkshire
20th century in South Lanarkshire